Mecistophylla disema is a species of snout moth in the genus Mecistophylla. It was described by Oswald Bertram Lower in 1905 and is known from Australia, including Victoria.

References

Moths described in 1905
Tirathabini